Wayne Jacobsen (Born March 21, 1953) is an American author and former pastor, best known for He Loves Me! a Christian nonfiction book. He also collaborated with author William P. Young on the writing of the novel The Shack and helped create the Christian publishing company Windblown Media. He has also been a contributing editor to Leadership Journal, and has authored numerous articles on spiritual formation, relational community, and engagement of culture.

Biography
Jacobsen attended Oral Roberts University in Tulsa, Oklahoma, graduating in 1975 with a bachelor's degree in Biblical Literature. Upon graduation he married Sara Fought of Urbana, Ohio, who graduated that same year.

Jacobsen began his full-time ministry in 1975 as an Associate Pastor at Valley Christian Center in Fresno, CA—a Foursquare church. In 1994, he left the ministry to found the Christian website Lifestream ministries, as well as the organization Bridgebuilders, through which he does public presentations and conflict mediation.

Jacobsen currently resides in Newbury Park, California with his wife. He has two children, Julie (b. 1978) and Andrew (b. 1980), and three grandchildren.

Major works
Jacobsen's books include He Loves Me!, In My Father's Vineyard, Authentic Relationships, So You Don't Want to Go to Church Anymore (coauthored with Dave Coleman, using joint pseudonym Jake Colsen), The Naked Church, and Tales of the Vine.

Jacobsen cohosted a weekly podcast at TheGodJourney.com, and was a mediator on governmental issues involving church and state in educational issues.

References

External links
 Lifestream, author's website

21st-century American novelists
American Christian writers
Living people
Oral Roberts University alumni
American male novelists
People from Selma, California
People from Newbury Park, California
21st-century American male writers
Novelists from California
21st-century American non-fiction writers
American male non-fiction writers
1953 births